is an underground metro station located in Atsuta-ku, Nagoya, Aichi Prefecture, Japan operated by the Nagoya Municipal Subway's Meijō Line. It is located 23.4 kilometers from the terminus of the Meijō Line at Kanayama Station.

The station was previously called  and its name was changed on 4 January 2023.

History
The station was opened on 30 March 1974.

Lines

 (Station number: M26)

Layout
Atsuta Jingu Temma-cho Station has two underground opposed side platforms.

Platforms

References

External links
 Temma-chō Station official web site 

Atsuta-ku, Nagoya
Railway stations in Japan opened in 1974
Railway stations in Nagoya